The Grouchy Ladybug, also known as The Very Grouchy Ladybug, is a 1977 children's book written by Eric Carle, best known as the author of The Very Hungry Caterpillar and 10 Little Rubber Ducks, and published by Greenwillow Books. In the United Kingdom it was published under the title The Bad-Tempered Ladybird. Based on a 2007 online poll, the National Education Association listed the book as one of its "Teachers' Top 100 Books for Children."

Plot
The story is about a Grouchy Ladybug who challenges a Friendly Ladybug to a fight over which one of them should eat some aphids for breakfast but then decides that the Friendly Ladybug is not large enough to be worth fighting. It then travels around the world and encounters a series of increasingly larger animals, such as a yellowjacket ("wasp" in the British edition), a stag beetle, a praying mantis, a sparrow, a lobster, a skunk, a boa constrictor, a hyena, a gorilla, a rhinoceros, and an elephant challenging each to a fight but then declining and looking for a larger animal. Eventually, it encounters a whale, who at first doesn't answer, and then slaps it with its tail and sends it flying back to where it started. The wet, tired, and hungry ladybug then decides to be nice and share the aphids with the fellow ladybug. The friendly ladybug says to the wet, tired, and hungry ladybug that it has saved some aphids. It then tells the other ladybug that it can have the aphids for dinner. 

The book is unusual in that the size of the pages are not the same throughout the book, instead increasing with the animals' sizes throughout the book. Also, the whale's tail takes up a page in itself and turning it is meant to represent the slapping motion. The time of day is also shown at the side of each page.

References

American picture books
1977 children's books
Children's fiction books
Picture books by Eric Carle